TR Babu Subramaniam is an American director and assistant director, best known for his work on Star Trek: The Next Generation. He was also involved in several other television series such as ER, The Paper Chase, Third Watch and One Tree Hill.

References

External links

American film directors of Indian descent
American television directors
Living people
Place of birth missing (living people)
Year of birth missing (living people)